Allan Lee (born in Hamilton, Scotland) is a film editor who lives in Vancouver, Canada and works regularly in Europe, UK and Canada.

Selected filmography 
1993 – Highlander
1995 – Magic in the Water
1997 – Bliss
1997–2002 – Stargate SG-1
1998 – Da Vinci's Inquest
2000 – Suspicious River
2002 – No Night Is Too Long
2004 – Earthsea,  The L Word
2005 – The 4400,  Terminal City
2006 – Skinwalkers,  Psych
2007 – Tin Man
2009 – Alice,  Defying Gravity
2010 – The Lost Future
2011 – Neverland
2012 – Continuum,  Missing
2013 – Eve of Destruction
2014 – Intruders
2015 – Olympus

Awards 
Gemini Awards 
1999
• 	Nominated, Gemini
Best Picture Editing in a Dramatic Program or Series for Da Vinci's Inquest (1998). 
Genie Awards 
1991
• 	Nominated, Genie
Best Achievement in Film Editing for Chaindance (1991). 
1989
• 	Nominated, Genie
Best Achievement in Film Editing for A Winter Tan (1987). 
Shared With: Susan Martin
Leo Awards 
2010
• 	Won, Leo
Best Picture Editing in a Feature Length Drama for Alice (2009). 
Shared With: Peter Forslund
2008
• 	Nominated, Leo
Best Picture Editing in a Dramatic Series for Tin Man (2007). 
Shared With: Peter Forslund
• For night 1.
2005
• 	Won, Leo
Feature Length Drama: Best Picture Editing for Earthsea (2004). 
2001
• 	Nominated, Leo
Best Picture Editing of Feature Length Drama for Suspicious River (2000). 
Primetime Emmy Awards 
2008
• 	Nominated, Primetime Emmy
Outstanding Single-Camera Picture Editing for a Miniseries or a Movie for Tin Man (2007). 
(Sci Fi Channel). 
• For part 1.

External links

British film editors
1963 births
Living people
Scottish editors